Marinobacter persicus is a Gram-negative, non-spore-forming, strictly aerobic and moderately halophilic bacterium from the genus of Marinobacter which has been isolated from the Aran-Bidgol Lake from the central desert of Iran.

References

External links
Type strain of Marinobacter persicus at BacDive -  the Bacterial Diversity Metadatabase

Alteromonadales
Bacteria described in 2013
Halophiles